Zemeros emesoides is a small butterfly that belongs to the family Riodinidae.

Subspecies
 Zemeros emesoides emesoides - Peninsular Malaya
 Zemeros emesoides zynias Fruhstorfer, 1914- Sumatra
 Zemeros emesoides bangueyanus Fruhstorfer, 1912 - Banggi
 Zemeros emesoides eso Fruhstorfer, 1904 – Borneo

Description
Zemeros emesoides is a midsized butterfly with coppery orange wings, characterized by orange and brown copper lines parallel to the margins. The underside wings have the same pattern.

Larvae feed on Maesa sp. (Primulaceae).

Distribution
This species can be found in Sumatra, Borneo, Peninsular Malaya and Singapore.

References
 Funet
 Tree of Life

Nemeobiinae
Butterflies of Asia
Butterflies described in 1860
Taxa named by Baron Cajetan von Felder
Taxa named by Rudolf Felder